Sardinal is a district of the Carrillo canton, in the Guanacaste province of Costa Rica.

Geography 

Villages
Administrative center of the district is the town of Sardinal.

Other villages in the district are Artola, Cacique, Coco, Guacamaya, Huaquitas, Libertad, Matapalo, Nancital, Nuevo Colón, Obandito, Ocotal, Pilas, Playa Hermosa, Playones, San Blas, Santa Rita and Zapotal.

Demographics 

For the 2011 census, Sardinal had a population of  inhabitants.

Transportation

Road transportation 
The district is covered by the following road routes:
 National Route 151
 National Route 159
 National Route 254
 National Route 255
 National Route 911
 National Route 912

References 

Districts of Guanacaste Province
Populated places in Guanacaste Province